Romena Rollana is a station on the Kyiv Light Rail. It was opened in 1977.

From September 30, 2019, Romena Rollana serves as the final stop of tram routes No 2 and No 3 during the reconstruction of Kiltseva Doroha.

External links
 

Kyiv Light Rail stations